Preben Fjære Brynemo (born 14 August 1977) is a Norwegian Nordic combined skier. He was born in Porsgrunn and represented the club Sannidal IL. He competed at the 2002 Winter Olympics in Salt Lake City, placing 22nd in the individual competition and 30th in the sprint.

References

1977 births
Living people
Nordic combined skiers at the 2002 Winter Olympics
Norwegian male Nordic combined skiers
Olympic Nordic combined skiers of Norway
People from Kragerø
Sportspeople from Porsgrunn